Nubeoscincus is a genus of skinks in the subfamily Eugongylinae. The genus Nubeoscincus is endemic to New Guinea.

Species
There are 2 species:
Nubeoscincus glacialis Greer, Allison & Cogger, 2005
Nubeoscincus stellaris Greer, Allison & Cogger, 2005

Nota bene: A binomial authority in parentheses indicates that the species was originally described in a genus other than Nubeoscincus.

References

 
Skinks of New Guinea
Lizard genera
Endemic fauna of New Guinea